Ledo may refer to:

 Ledo, Assam, India, a town
 Ledo, Jharkhand, India, a village and former Zamindari Gadi in pergana Kharagdiha
 Ledo Airfield, a World War II United States Army Air Forces airfield in India
 Ledo Road, a World War II road connecting Ledo, India, to Kunming, China
 Ledo Pizza, an American restaurant chain
 Ledo (company), a Croatian ice cream producer
 Ledo (name), a list of people with the surname or given name

See also
 Leto (disambiguation)
 Lido (disambiguation)